General Townshend may refer to:

Charles Townshend (British Army officer) (1861–1924), British Army major general
George Townshend, 1st Marquess Townshend (1724–1807), British Army general
Henry Dive Townshend (1795–1882), British Army lieutenant general

See also
General Townsend (disambiguation)